Rio Conchos is a 1964 American Cinemascope Western film directed by Gordon Douglas and starring Richard Boone, Stuart Whitman, Anthony Franciosa, Edmond O'Brien, and in his motion picture debut, Jim Brown, based on Clair Huffaker's novel "Guns of Rio Conchos" published in 1958.

Huffaker's novel is reminiscent of the John Wayne films The Comancheros (for which Huffaker co-wrote the screenplay) and The Searchers. The main female role, played by Wende Wagner in a black wig, has no English dialogue. Rio Conchos was filmed in Moab, Utah, though the Conchos River and most of the action of the film takes place in Mexico.

Jerry Goldsmith's complete soundtrack was given a limited release on CD in January 2000 by Film Score Monthly that featured a tie-in title song by Johnny Desmond.

On June 21, 2011, Shout! Factory released the film on DVD as part of a double feature with Take a Hard Ride (1975).

Plot 
An ex-Confederate States Army officer (Richard Boone) named Jim Lassiter, who has been out for revenge against Apache Indians who massacred his family, recovers a stolen U.S. Army repeating rifle from some Apaches he has killed. As the Apaches have proven formidable with lesser weaponry, there is cause for concern should they become equipped with such superior firepower.

The U.S. Army arrests him, then offers Lassiter his freedom if he leads a small, clandestine scouting unit into Mexico consisting of an Army captain (Stuart Whitman), a Buffalo Soldier sergeant (Jim Brown), a knife-wielding Mexican prisoner (Tony Franciosa), and later an Apache woman warrior (Wende Wagner).

After blasting their way through bandits and Apaches, they discover Colonel Pardee, another former rebel soldier (Edmond O'Brien), has set up a new Confederate headquarters, and is selling guns to the Apaches, including the ones who slaughtered Lassiter's family.

The woman, who is called Sally, saves his life, so Lassiter puts aside his hatred. He and Franklyn sacrifice themselves to save Sally and the Army captain Haven while holding off Pardee and his men.

Cast

Production
Parts of the film were shot at Professor Valley, Fisher Towers, Castle Valley, Arches, and Dead Horse Point in Utah.

Billing
The posters used the same approach to billing as Warner Bros. had in 1948's Key Largo, for which Humphrey Bogart had been listed first but Edward G. Robinson was placed in the middle of the three above-the-title leads with his name elevated higher than the other two (the third name being Lauren Bacall's). In the case of Rio Conchos, Whitman was billed as Bogart had been, with Boone in Robinson's middle slot and Franciosa in Bacall's spot, with his name listed third going left to right and at the same height as Whitman's. Boone, however, was billed before Whitman during the beginning onscreen credits, with each name appearing onscreen one at a time.

Reception
According to Fox records, the film needed to earn $5,300,000 in film rentals to break even, but it only made $4,610,000.

Comic book
Gold Key Comics published a film tie-in comic book in 1964.

See also
List of American films of 1964

References

External links
 
 
 
 

1964 films
1960s English-language films
1964 Western (genre) films
American Western (genre) films
20th Century Fox films
Rio Conchos
CinemaScope films
Films directed by Gordon Douglas
Films set in Mexico
Films shot in Utah
Films based on American novels
Films based on Western (genre) novels
Films scored by Jerry Goldsmith
1960s American films